Joseph Washington McClurg (February 22, 1818December 2, 1900) was the  19th Governor of Missouri in the decade following the American Civil War. His stepfather was William Murphy.

Biography
Born near St. Louis, Missouri, McClurg was orphaned at seven and raised by grandparents in Pittsburgh, Pennsylvania, where his grandfather owned the city's first iron foundry. Educated at Xenia Academy and Oxford College in Ohio, he taught school briefly in Louisiana and Mississippi in the 1830s before returning to St. Louis to serve as deputy for his uncle, Sheriff Marshall Brotherton. At 19, he studied law and was admitted to the bar in Texas, although he never practiced. In 1841, he returned to Missouri to marry Mary Catherine Johnson. He was involved in lead mining and merchandising and created McClurg's Old Salt Road through rural Missouri to assure a supply of salt for his customers. In 1844, he would operate a store in Hazelwood (the first county seat of Webster County), Missouri with his stepfather.

In 1850, McClurg left Missouri for the gold rush in California, where he opened a miner's store in Georgetown (12 miles from Sutter's Mill). After two years, he returned to Missouri, this time to Linn Creek (now under the Lake of the Ozarks), where he established a thriving business supplying settlers and merchants in Missouri, Arkansas, Texas and the Indian Territory.

An avid unionist, he was a delegate to the historic Gamble Convention in March 1861, in which Missouri agreed to stay in the Union. Although he was later to sign the 13th Amendment as a Missouri Representative, Joseph McClurg was a slaveowner until shortly before the issuance of the Emancipation Proclamation.  During the Civil War, McClurg was a colonel of the 8th Missouri State Militia Cavalry, until elected to the U.S. House of Representatives in 1862, 1864 and 1866.

He resigned his last term to run for Missouri governor as a Radical Republican, a party against the re-enfranchisement of ex-Confederates. He served a two-year term and with Radical Republicanism falling from favor, lost his bid for re-election. In 1886, he accompanied his son, Joseph, and his daughter, Fannie along with her six children, to homestead in the Dakota Territory. It was an entrepreneurial venture made promising on the basis of several years of mild weather; however, the winter of 1886-87 was a famously cruel one that convinced the family to return to Missouri. He was appointed Registrar of Lands at Springfield before returning to Lebanon, Missouri, where he died in 1900.

References

 Retrieved on October 18, 2008

External links

1818 births
1900 deaths
People from St. Louis County, Missouri
Unconditional Union Party members of the United States House of Representatives from Missouri
Missouri Unconditional Unionists
Republican Party members of the United States House of Representatives from Missouri
Governors of Missouri
Republican Party governors of Missouri
Radical Republicans
Union Army colonels
People of Missouri in the American Civil War
19th-century American politicians